Ayodele "Dele" Adeleye (born 25 December 1988) is a Nigerian former professional footballer who played as a centre-back.

Club career
Adeleye is a defender who was born in Lagos and made his debut in professional football as part of the Shooting Stars FC squad before joining Sparta Rotterdam. Reports had linked him to English Premier League clubs Everton, West Ham United and Blackburn Rovers. After Sparta's relegation Adeleye went to FC Metalurh Donetsk on a free transfer in June 2010.
On 2 September 2011: Tavria have officially announced the signing of two Nigerian international players – Dele Adeleye and Sani Kaita- through a statement on their official website, FC Tavria, Dele Adeleye, in the Nigeria squad for two live-wire games against Madagascar on Sunday, comes from Donetsk Metallurg, where he scored three goals in 26 appearances from central defense. 
In August 2013, Adeleye signed for Anzhi Makhachkala.
In January 2014 Adeleye moved to Greek side Ergotelis on a Five-month contract, with the option of another year.

In February 2015, Adeleye signed a two-year-contract with Kazakhstan Premier League side FC Aktobe. Following the conclusion of the 2015 season, Adeleye was transfer listed by Aktobe.

On 20 February 2018, after two years of free agency, he joined Russian club FC SKA-Khabarovsk. He only made two appearances for the club, before leaving again as the club were relegated Russian First League and eventually retired from football.

International career
A tall central defender, Adeleye caught the eye of Sparta when playing 3 matches for the Nigeria U-20 at the 2005 FIFA Youth World Cup in the Netherlands. He made his first senior cap in a friendly against Ireland on 29 May 2009.

Career statistics

Club

International

References

External links
 
 Player profile – Sparta Rotterdam
 Career stats – Voetbal international 

1988 births
Living people
Yoruba sportspeople
Nigerian footballers
Nigerian expatriate footballers
Expatriate footballers in the Netherlands
Expatriate footballers in Ukraine
Expatriate footballers in Russia
Expatriate footballers in Greece
Expatriate footballers in Kazakhstan
Association football defenders
Shooting Stars S.C. players
Sparta Rotterdam players
FC Metalurh Donetsk players
SC Tavriya Simferopol players
FC Anzhi Makhachkala players
Ergotelis F.C. players
OFI Crete F.C. players
FC Aktobe players
FC SKA-Khabarovsk players
Eredivisie players
Ukrainian Premier League players
Russian Premier League players
Super League Greece players
Kazakhstan Premier League players
Nigeria under-20 international footballers
Footballers at the 2008 Summer Olympics
Olympic footballers of Nigeria
Olympic silver medalists for Nigeria
Sportspeople from Lagos
2010 FIFA World Cup players
Olympic medalists in football
Medalists at the 2008 Summer Olympics
Nigerian expatriate sportspeople in the Netherlands
Nigerian expatriate sportspeople in Ukraine
Nigerian expatriate sportspeople in Russia
Nigerian expatriate sportspeople in Greece
Nigerian expatriate sportspeople in Kazakhstan
FC Kuban Krasnodar players
Nigeria international footballers